Command Records was a record label founded by Enoch Light in 1959  and, in October that year, was acquired by ABC-Paramount Records. Light produced a majority of the releases in the label's catalog.

Origin and history
After Grand Award Records, the company focused on producing records targeted at audiophiles. Light and sound engineer Bob Fine handled the recording and engineering responsibilities, employing the technique of multiple microphone pickups. They used different types of microphones whose characteristics were best suited to reproduce the sounds of a particular instrument.

Command Records often featured abstract covers. In the early years, all covers were designed by Josef Albers, whose student Charles E. Murphy served as design director. Several are in the collection of the Museum of Modern Art in New York City. Later covers appeared to be imitations of Albers' work.

In 1966, Light left Command to form Project 3 Records.

Recording technique

While the recording industry had made magnetic tape the standard for recording music for release on vinyl, Command's albums were recorded onto magnetic 35mm  film. Light used the width of the film strip to create multitrack recordings, as opposed to the more limited two or three tracks offered by most recording studios at the time; the slightly higher linear speed provided an advantage in analog fidelity and the sprocket-driven film limited the "wow and flutter" problems associated with tape recording. This enabled Light to record more instruments individually and adjust their audio input levels, as well as their stereo position.

Command test record

The Command test record (Stereo Check Out) was an LP album produced by Command Records in 1960. It contained recordings designed to allow users to test their stereo equipment.

Album details
Like many other Command records, the Stereo Check Out came in a gatefold cover with extensive liner notes and full technical data inside. Charles Stark narrated both sides, providing both technical details and information about the musical instruments used on the tracks on Side Two.

Side one
Side One of this LP consists of turntable tests. An oscilloscope is a useful tool when used in conjunction with these tests:

 Stereo Balance Check
 Left and Right Channel Check
 Volume Reference Check
 Frequency Run Check
 Output Balance Check
 Flutter or Wow Check
 Phasing Check
 Acoustical Check
 Rumble Check

Side two
Side Two of this LP consists of musical selections from the Command catalogue:

 Hernando's Hideaway (from Provocative Percussion Vol II)
 Cumana (from Provocative Piano)
 Tenderly (from bongos)
 Enjoy Yourself Cha-Cha (from Pertinent Percussion Cha-Cha's)

Selected Albums

  Enoch Light...And His Orchestra – A Discothèque  Dance...Dance...Dance
  Enoch Light...And His Orchestra – Paperback Ballet
  Enoch Light...And The Light Brigade – Big Bold And Brassy
  Enoch Light...And The Light Brigade – Vibrations
  Enoch Light...Big Band Bossa Nova – The New Beat From Brazil
  Enoch Light...And The Light Brigade - Happy Cha Cha
  Enoch Light...Command Performances
  Los Admiradores - Bongos/Flutes/Guitars RS 812 SD 1960
  Off Beat Percussion – Don Lamond and His Orchestra
  Terry Snyder And The All Stars – Persuasive Percussion
  Terry Snyder And The All Stars – Persuasive Percussion Volume 2
  Terry Snyder And The All Stars – Persuasive Percussion Volume 3
  Enoch Light...And The Light Brigade – Provocative Percussion
  Enoch Light...And The Light Brigade – Provocative Percussion Volume 2
  Provocation Piano – Dick Hyman and His Orchestra
  The Man From O.R.G.A.N. – Dick Hyman
  Spanish Guitar – Tony Mottola and his orchestra (1962)
  Persuasive Trombone of Urbie Green Volume 1
  Persuasive Trombone of Urbie Green Volume 2
  Enoch Light...& The Light Brigade – A New Concept of Great Cole Porter Songs  CQD40002 1971
  Doc Severinsen...His Trumpet and Orchestra Fever!  CQD40003  1971
  Ravel – Daphnis Et Chloe, Suite No.2 -Pierre Dervaux Command Classics CC33-11005 1961
  Ravel Bolero – Rapsodie Espagnole- Pierre Dervaux Command Classics CC33-11007 1961
 Tony Mottola And His Orchestra – Roman Guitar RS 816 SD

See also

 Grand Award Records
 List of record labels

References

Defunct record labels of the United States
Jazz record labels
American companies established in 1959
Mass media companies established in 1959